Balrampur  is the headquarters of  Balrampur-Ramanujganj district of the Indian state of Chhattisgarh.It is a obscure town but after it was named district headquarter of the newly established district the population is growing rapidly. It is 441 km North of the state headquarters Raipur.Balrampur share Chhattisgarh border with Uttar Pradesh and Jharkhand.

Geography 
It is an important junction Connecting Ambikapur, Ramanujganj, Kusmi and Pratappur and Rajpur.

Facilities

 District Collectorate composite building (4 km from city in Ramanujganj road)
 State police training centre 
 District hospital
 District Police Station & State Police Office Balrampur
 Pawai waterfall( 10 km from city)

Transport

Road
Balrampur has collectorate of the district and well connected by all towns of district. National highway 343 connects to Garhwa Jharkhand and Ambikapur Chhattisgarh. Via Ramanujganj Garhwa Jharkhand is accessible. It is linked with Ambikapur, India Via Jhalaria  → Rajpur → Baghima -> Ambikapur.

Rail
The nearest railway station are Ambikapur and Garhwa.

See also
 Balrampur district, Chhattisgarh
 Ramanujganj

References

Community development blocks in Balrampur district, Chhattisgarh
Community development blocks in Chhattisgarh
Cities and towns in Balrampur district, Chhattisgarh